Idakho, Isukha, and Tiriki (Luidakho, Luisukha, Lutirichi) are mutually intelligible Kenyan languages within the Luhya ethnic group. They are a set of languages closely related to some other Luhya ethnic groups like Maragoli, but less so in comparison to others, like Bukusu,Tachoni or Samia,

Tiriki 
Tiriki, or known by the autoglossonym Lutirichi, is a language variety spoken in western Kenya and eastern Uganda within the Luyia language family. It is the southeasternmost of the Luyia dialects, spoken primarily in Hamisi Constituency in Vihiga County, Western Province, Kenya. As reported in the 15th ed. of the Ethnologue, a 1980 survey by Bernd Heine and Wilhelm Möhlig estimated there to be 100,000 speakers of Tiriki. The 17th ed. of the Ethnologue indicates a Tiriki-speaking population of 210,000 based on the 2009 Kenyan census, which surveyed ethnicity not language.

References

Languages of Kenya
Great Lakes Bantu languages